Marlon Mauricio Mejía Díaz, known as Marlon Mejía (born 21 September 1994) is an Ecuadorian professional football player. He plays for Orense S.C..

International career
He represented Ecuador at the 2011 FIFA U-17 World Cup.

He made his debut for the Ecuador national football team on 27 October 2021 in a friendly against Mexico.

References

External links
 

1994 births
Sportspeople from Guayaquil
Living people
Ecuadorian footballers
Ecuador youth international footballers
Ecuador under-20 international footballers
Ecuador international footballers
Association football defenders
C.S. Emelec footballers
Ecuadorian Serie A players